Steven Leonard Joyce (born 7 April 1963) is a New Zealand former politician, who entered the New Zealand House of Representatives in 2008 as a member of the New Zealand National Party. In the same year he became Minister of Transport and Minister for Communications and Information Technology. He later became Minister of Science and Innovation, and then served as Minister for Finance and Minister for Infrastructure.

As a broadcasting entrepreneur with RadioWorks, he was a millionaire before he entered politics.

On 6 March 2018, he announced his resignation from politics, after losing his bid for the leadership of the party.

Early life
Joyce's parents worked as grocers. He went to school at Francis Douglas Memorial College, before enrolling at Massey University, applying to study veterinary science. However he "missed the cut", graduating instead with a BSc in zoology. While at university he worked as a presenter and programme director on student radio. He also took fifteen economics papers at Massey from 1982 to 1986, withdrew or did not complete seven of them and failed one through insufficient grade.

Broadcasting career
After leaving university Joyce and a group of friends (including radio presenter Jeremy Corbett) started their own radio station, Energy FM, in New Plymouth. With business partners, he built up RadioWorks over the next seventeen years, both organically and by acquisition, to a network of 22 radio stations and 650 staff. He retired as Managing Director of RadioWorks in April 2001, when CanWest purchased it, Joyce receiving $6 million for the sale.

After RadioWorks he joined the New Zealand National Party, working as their campaign manager in both the 2005 and the 2008 general elections. He was announced as a list only candidate for the party in the 2002 general election, but did not appear on the final list. He also served as CEO of Jasons Travel Media for two years until 2008.

In 2010 while Minister of Transport, Joyce admitted to two prior driving convictions, careless driving resulting in a fine in 1988, and careless driving causing injury resulting in a fine and loss of licence in 1989.

Member of Parliament

First term, 2008–2011
On 8 November 2008, Joyce was elected as a list-only candidate (ranked 16th on the party list) at the 2008 election in the Fifth National Government of New Zealand of the 49th Parliament of New Zealand representing the New Zealand National Party.

As a first term member of parliament, Joyce was appointed to the office of the Minister of Transport and the office of the Communications and Information Technology. Joyce was also appointed as a member of the Executive Council and was titled as The Honourable Steven Leonard Joyce, MP. During his tenure as Minister of Transport a number of changes were introduced. In November 2009 a ban on using cellphones while driving came into effect.

In 2010, New Zealand's unique right-hand rule at intersections was reversed. The minimum driving age was also raised from 15 to 16. Both measures were subject to cabinet approval and public consultation, and eventually passed into law.

This minimum driving age proposal was criticised by the editorial board of The New Zealand Herald for being too hesitant after experts and the public had favoured raising the driving age as high as 18 and in the opinion of the newspaper, Joyce "had not shown the resolve to follow the recommendations".

He helped create Auckland Transport as a council-controlled organisation for Auckland. Joyce stated that "Auckland will need a good agency focused on delivering the projects that have been agreed by council" and noting that Council had a number of ways of ensuring that the entity was accountable.

Joyce was also appointed to the Office of Minister for Tertiary Education, Skills and Employment replacing Anne Tolley, effective 27 January 2010.

Second term, 2011–2014

In the 2011 election for the 50th New Zealand Parliament Joyce retained his seat in Parliament (as a list candidate, now rated 13th on the party list) and was appointed to the office of Minister for Economic Development. in the Fifth National Government of New Zealand. His previous role as Minister of Transport passed to Gerry Brownlee.

In May 2013, he signed a deal with casino Skycity Auckland, allowing it to install an additional 230 pokie machines and 40 new gambling tables, in exchange for building a $402 million convention centre.

In August 2013, he was given responsibility to investigate both the Novopay debacle and the 2013 Fonterra recall.

Third term, 2014–2017
In what became known as the Waitangi dildo incident, a rubber sex toy was thrown at Joyce during an anti-TPPA protest at the 2016 Waitangi Day celebrations while he was speaking to media. The protester responsible, Josie Butler, a nurse from Christchurch, shouted "That’s for raping our sovereignty". She claimed she was protesting against the TPPA. She was taken away by police, but not charged.

On 20 December 2016, Joyce was appointed as Minister of Finance and Infrastructure. During the lead-up to the 2017 general election, Joyce alleged that there was an NZ$11 billion hole in the opposition Labour Party's fiscal plan. These charges were disputed by Labour politicians including Opposition Leader Jacinda Ardern and Deputy Leader Kelvin Davis.

During the 2017 election, Joyce stood on the National Party list and was re-elected. National won 44% of the popular vote and 56 seats; maintaining its plurality in the New Zealand House of Representatives. However, National fell short of the majority needed to govern alone. Following post-election negotiations, Labour formed a coalition government with the opposition New Zealand First and Green parties.

In Opposition, 2017–2018
Following the formation of a Labour-led coalition government, Joyce became the National Party's Spokesperson for Finance and Infrastructure. He was also allocated a seat on the Finance and Expenditure Select Committee. However, on 6 March 2018, Joyce announced he would resign from Parliament, reportedly after not being offered the Finance portfolio under new National leader Simon Bridges, who had replaced Bill English.

Private life
Joyce lives in Albany with his wife Suzanne and their two children.

References

External links

 MediaWorks repays 'Joyce loan' for radio licences, nzherald.co.nz, 4 October 2012; accessed 26 January 2017.
Profile, national.org.nz; accessed 26 January 2017. 

|-

|-

|-

|-

|-

|-

|-

1963 births
Living people
Massey University alumni
Members of the Cabinet of New Zealand
Members of the New Zealand House of Representatives
New Zealand businesspeople
New Zealand National Party MPs
New Zealand radio presenters
People from New Plymouth
People educated at Francis Douglas Memorial College
New Zealand list MPs
New Zealand finance ministers
21st-century New Zealand politicians
Candidates in the 2017 New Zealand general election
People educated at Kapiti College